Artyom Pavlovich Motov (born 28 July 1990) is a former Russian professional football player.

Club career
He made his Russian Football National League debut for FC Shinnik Yaroslavl on 16 October 2007 in a game against FC Salyut-Energiya Belgorod. That was his only season in the FNL.

External links
 
 Career summary by sportbox.ru
 

1990 births
Living people
Russian footballers
Association football forwards
FC Shinnik Yaroslavl players
FC Tekstilshchik Ivanovo players
FC Avangard Kursk players
FC Vityaz Podolsk players
FC Chita players